Nautococcus may refer to:
 Nautococcus (bug), a genus of bugs in the family Margarodidae
 Nautococcus (alga), a genus of algae in the family Chlorococcaceae